Whose Line is it Anyway? (often known as simply Whose Line? or WLIIA) is a British improvisational comedy series, which was originally hosted by Clive Anderson on Channel 4 and ran from 23 September 1988 to 4 February 1999.  The final series coincided with the first season of the American series; Ryan Stiles, Colin Mochrie, and Wayne Brady, who all appeared in the British series, are all regular performers on the American version, with episodes of the British TV series having also been recorded in New York in 1991.

The show consists of a panel of four performers who create characters, scenes and songs on the spot, in the style of short-form improvisation games, many taken from theatresports. Topics for the games are based on either audience suggestions or predetermined prompts from the host. Both the British and the American shows ostensibly take the form of a game show with the host arbitrarily assigning points and likewise choosing a winner at the end of each episode. However, the show lacks the true stakes and competition of a game show (by design). The "game show" format is simply part of the comedy.

Series overview

Episodes 
"Winner(s)" of each episode as chosen by host Clive Anderson are highlighted in italics.

Series 1 (1988)

Series 2 (1989–90)

Series 3 (1991)

Series 4 (1992)

Series 5 (1993)

Series 6 (1994–95)

Series 7 (1995)

Series 8 (1996)

Series 9 (1997–98)

Series 10 (1998–99)

Comic Relief Specials

See also
 Whose Line Is It Anyway? (American TV series)
 List of Whose Line Is It Anyway? (American TV series) episodes

External links 
 Mark's guide to Whose Line is it Anyway? – Episode Guide
 Mark's guide to Whose Line is it Anyway? – Episode Guide – Radio Series
 Whose Line Is It Anyway? (UK) (a Participants & Air Dates Guide)

Whose Line Is It Anyway? (UK)
Whose Line Is It Anyway?